Löwe or Loewe (German for "lion") may refer to:

People
Loewe (surname)

Business
Loewe (electronics), a German television sets and other electronics maker
LOEWE (fashion brand), a Spanish luxury clothing and accessories brand
Löwe Automobil, a German automotive parts manufacturer

Military
Panzer VII Löwe, a WW2 German tank project
HNoMS Gyller (1938), a Norwegian warship captured by Nazi Germany and renamed Löwe

Other
Nordische Löwe, a ship owned by the Danish East India Company
Der Löwe (1944–1973), a racehorse and stud stallion

See also
Löw
Lowe (disambiguation)
Loewi
Loewy
Lion (disambiguation)